Going for Broke is a 2003 Canadian-American made-for-television drama film directed by Graeme Campbell and starring Delta Burke, Elliot Page, Matthew Harbour, Francis X. McCarthy and Gerald McRaney. It is based on the true story of former Juvenile Diabetes Foundation charity director Gina Garcia, who from 1993 to 1997 fraudulently issued cheques from the charity to herself in order to funnel money into her bank account for her compulsive gambling addiction, after which she was arrested, resulting in legislation that required that casinos and other gaming establishments in the state of Nevada have a telephone number posted for gambling addiction services. The film was also notable for being one of Elliot Page's early American acting roles (as Page was originally from the Eastern Canadian province of Nova Scotia), before mainstream success in films such as Juno, Hard Candy and The Tracey Fragments.

Plot
Laura Bancroft (Delta Burke), a charity director, and her husband Jim (Gerald McRaney), move to Reno, Nevada with their two children, Jennifer and Tom "Tommy" Bancroft (Elliot Page and Matthew Harbour). As a special treat, the family attends a restaurant that doubles as a casino, where Laura plays the slot machines with the encouragement of Jim and Bella (Joyce Gordon), an elderly compulsive gambler who claims that her own habits are all just social in nature. After winning five-hundred dollars, Laura becomes addicted to the restaurant's machines; meanwhile, she gets hired on as a director for a large medical charity and gets friendly local benefactor Brad Bradford (Francis X. McCarthy) to donate money. Increasingly unable to find time for her family as she juggles her career and her gambling habits, Laura misses Jennifer's school mother-daughter tea party and pawns Tommy's bicycle. She also neglects Jim, getting into frequent arguments with him when he accuses her of having a gambling problem. Laura continues to neglect her children, forgetting to feed them or pay the bills, only returning once to drop off a package of oatmeal that she bought for them with the last of her money. Jennifer rebelliously adopts a goth lifestyle and moves in with an older boyfriend, returning only to look after Tommy.

Laura wins the jackpot, receiving fifty-thousand dollars and a free weekend in an expensive hotel room, but Jim is displeased, noting that his wife has pawned off sentimental family items from his ancestors, as well as electronics belonging to the children. Laura reacts with hostility, separating from Jim and threatening to sue him if he files for custody of the children. Jim returns home to pick up his belongings and shares a tearful farewell with Jennifer and Tommy. For their safety, he drops off both children at their grandparents' house. Laura loses all of her jackpot winnings in one night and longs for more money. She begins stealing large amounts of money from the charity by writing fraudulent cheques, gambling this away, unbeknownst to Bradford or colleague Martine (Mary Donnelly Haskell), who worry about her strange behaviour. Bella advises Laura to seek help after Laura begs her for an informal loan. Jennifer's grandmother (Patricia Gage) encourages her granddaughter to break up with her boyfriend and stay in school, shocked that Laura fails to react at all to the news that Jennifer didn't return home (having spent the night underage at a rave while drinking vodka). A tax auditor, Mr. Ken Dowling (Richard Jutras), arrives to do a random audit of the charity and discovers Laura's theft of the funds, while Laura has a panic attack in her office until Mr. Dowling and Martine start looking for her. Charged for fraud and facing bankruptcy as well, Laura returns to her empty house to face her mother, who tells her, "I don't know whether to hold you or slap you!" before the two break down and hug, crying together. Laura is sentenced to prison, while her parents, Jennifer, Tommy, Mr. Dowling and Martine all react bitterly to her pleas for forgiveness. An ending credit message reveals that the real "Laura Bancroft" (Garcia) was responsible for the enactment of legislation addressing gambling addiction in Nevada during her time incarcerated.

Cast
 Delta Burke as Laura Bancroft
 Elliot Page as Jennifer Bancroft
 Matthew Harbour as Tom "Tommy" Bancroft
 Gerald McRaney as Jim Bancroft
 Richard Jutras as Mr. Ken Dowling, the auditor
 Mary Donnelly Haskell as Martine
 Spiro Malandrakis (as "Spiro Maland") as Connor
 Joyce Gordon as Bella
 Raymond Stone as The Judge
 Patricia Gage as Grandma Lois Bancroft
 Francis X. McCarthy ( as "Francis-Xavier McCarthy") as Brad Bradford
 Norris Domingue as Grandpa Frank Bancroft

Production
Although set in Reno, Nevada, Going For Broke was shot entirely in the city of Montreal, in the province of Quebec, Canada.

Reception
Ben Stamos of FilmInk said of Going For Broke, "the Turner Classic Movie, Going for Broke, is a great example of a TV movie that is able to pull back the curtain on the realities of gambling addiction. As the movie progresses, the audience can see the mental strain wearing Laura down, her priorities changing from where they began at opening credits and the desperation that drives her to make worse and worse decisions." Going For Broke aired of the Lifetime Movie Network in the United States and various local stations in Canada, after which it was released to DVD video by Lifetime. A German edition of the film (English with German and Polish subtitles) was released to DVD by Paramount, where it appeared sporadically on Amazon. Bootleg uploads of the film continue to appear on YouTube, while it streams legitimately through Turner Classic Movies and continues to be sold on DVD.

Notes

References

External links

2003 films
Lifetime (TV network) films
Quebec films
English-language Canadian films
Films set in Reno, Nevada
Films about addiction
Films about gambling
Crime films based on actual events
Films directed by Graeme Campbell (director)
Canadian drama television films
2000s Canadian films